The Tianshan Volcanic Group is a volcanic field in the Tianshan Mountains in Northwest China. The historically active Cone of Pechan is within the group (also known as Peishan, Baishan, Hochan, Aghie, Bichbalick, Khala, and Boschan). The volcano is 440 km southwest of Urumqi, Xinjiang.

Eruptions

Two eruptions are known from Tianshan, in 50 AD (± 50 years) and 650 AD (± 50 years). The book, Aspects of Nature in Different Lands and Different Climates, Volume 1, reports that Pechan cone sent out streams of lava in the seventh century. The Chinese General, Teu-Hian (who was fleeing from the Chinese army) said that when climbing the Tianshan Mountains, saw "The Fire Mountains which send out masses of molten rock which flow for many Li"

References
 Global Volcanism Program, Tianshan Volcanic Group
 Volcano Live
 Aspects of Nature in Different Lands and Different Climates, Volume 1: By Alexander Von Humboldt, David Knight 

Volcanic groups
Volcanoes of China
Landforms of Xinjiang